The Naviglio di Paderno was a navigable canal of the Navigli system in the Lombardy region of Northern Italy. Approximately 3 kilometers (1.8 mi) long, it was built to bypass the rapids on the Adda River in the Paderno d'Adda section of the river.

This is the canal where Leonardo da Vinci famously experimented his new mitred gates for pound locks.

Canals in Lombardy
Waterways of Italy
Transport in Lombardy